The 1995 International League season took place from April to September 1995.

The Ottawa Lynx defeated the Norfolk Tides to win the league championship.

Attendance
Charlotte Knights - 336,001
Columbus Clippers - 541,451
Norfolk Tides - 586,317
Ottawa Lynx - 511,865
Pawtucket Red Sox - 486,029
Richmond Braves - 524,210
Rochester Red Wings - 402,127
Scranton/Wilkes-Barre Red Barons - 489,040
Syracuse Chiefs - 303,208
Toledo Mud Hens - 306,906

Standings

Stats

Batting leaders

Pitching leaders

Regular season

All-Star game
The 1995 Triple-A All-Star Game was held at Lackawanna County Stadium, home of the IL's Scranton/Wilkes-Barre Red Barons. The All stars representing the American League affiliates won 9-0. Syracuse Chiefs third baseman Howard Battle won the top award for the International League.

Playoffs

Division Series
The Ottawa Lynx won the East Division Finals over the Rochester Red Wings, 3 games to 2.

The Norfolk Tides won the West Division Finals over the Richmond Braves, 3 games to 2.

Championship series
The Ottawa Lynx won its first Governors' Cup Championship in franchise history, by beating the Norfolk Tides, 3 games to 1.

References

External links
International League official website 

 
International League seasons